Andrew Herman Apter (born December 7, 1956) is an American historian, professor at University of California, Los Angeles, and Director of the African Studies Center.

He was field director of Black Atlantic Studies, for the Social Science Research Council.

Awards
2010 Guggenheim Fellow

Works
 Beyond Words: Discourse and Critical Agency in Africa, University of Chicago Press, 2007, 
 Black Critics and Kings: The Hermeneutics of Power in Yoruba Society, University of Chicago Press, 1992, 
 The Pan-African Nation: Oil and the Spectacle of Culture in Nigeria, University of Chicago Press, 2005, 
"Atinga Revisited", Modernity and its malcontents: ritual and power in postcolonial Africa, Editors Jean Comaroff, John L. Comaroff, University of Chicago Press, 1993, 
"IBB = 419: Nigerian Democracy and the Politics of Illusion", Civil society and the political imagination in Africa: critical perspectives, Editors John L. Comaroff, Jean Comaroff, University of Chicago Press, 1999,

Further reading

References

External links

University of California, Los Angeles faculty
American Africanists
Living people
1956 births
21st-century American historians
21st-century American male writers
Historians from California
American male non-fiction writers